Ural State University of Railway Transport (USURT) or Уральский государственный университет путей сообщения (УрГУПС) is a public university situated in Yekaterinburg, Russia. It was founded in 1956. USURT is a large modern multidisciplinary technical university mainly focused on training of railway transport specialists of the Urals Federal District.

USURT is a vertically integrated educational complex located in the territory of five constituent entities of the Russian Federation: Yekaterinburg, Perm, Kurgan, Chelyabinsk, Tyumen. The university complex includes the head university in Yekaterinburg, a railway transport college, a medical college, institutes in Chelyabinsk, Perm, and Kurgan, branches in Nizhny Tagil and Tyumen, a representative office in Kartaly. 

The university complex implements a multi-level system of continuing education including pre-university training, secondary vocational education, higher education, and additional vocational education.

The university preserves long-standing traditions and develops the latest trends in the field of education, science and innovation and provides a solid base for the formation of the personnel potential of the transport industry. Graduates of USURT are real leaders with technological, organizational and business competencies. The university contributes to the implementation of large-scale projects in Russia and abroad.

All educational programs of the university complex, including branches, have passed state and professional-public accreditation.

History 
In the mid-twentieth century, the active development of new types of products began, equipment was renewed, relations of the Urals with other regions of the country were expanded. The importance of railway transportation increased significantly, especially in the Ural-Siberian zone. There was an urgent need to create an engineering university that would train personnel for railways. 

On November 17, 1956, Ural Electromechanical Institute of Railway Engineers was opened. The first building of the university was located on Yakov Sverdlov Street, 11-a, on the basis of Sverdlovsk Railway Technical School. In 1957, the evening faculty was opened. In 1958, two basic faculties were created - electromechanical and electrotechnical, and in 1959 – the correspondence faculty.

On November 16, 1964, the doors of the first stage of the main educational building opened. The institute moved to a new building located on the bank of the city pond in the area of Generalskaya dacha. Spacious auditoria, laboratories and offices were occupied by general education departments, as well as all the departments of electromechanical faculty. 

Along with the building of the transport university, its educational activities also expanded. In 1966, building faculty was opened. In the same year, the department of railway operation was organized, which was later renamed into the faculty of transportation management. 

In 1968, the department of railway cars and wagon facilities was organized, as well as the faculty of advanced training of managers and specialists of railway transport was opened. 

In 1971, mechanical faculty was formed.

In 1975, the departments of building structures and building production began their work. As a result of such an educational evolution in the 1970s and 1980s, the number of students increased from 600 to 7,000, teaching staff increased to 357, 45 percent of whom had academic degrees and titles. 

In 1992, the university successfully passed attestation, and in 1993, licensing. In 1994, the university received a new status and was renamed to Ural State Academy of Railway Transport (USART). The academy became one of the largest railway universities in Russia. There were 8 faculties, 28 departments, 34 scientific divisions, 1 branch and 6 training and consulting centers. International relations of the university began to develop actively.

In 1999, the academy received the status of a technical university - Ural State University of Railway Transport (USURT) based on the results of its work and the quality of specialists' training. In the same year, the faculty of economics and management was opened.

With the advent of the new century, new educational trends came to the transport university. Almost all faculties opened new directions and specialties. The transition to the multilevel system of training began.

On the basis of USURT, a branch regional center of scientific and methodological support was created, which allows to coordinate the activities of all educational institutions involved in training personnel for transport enterprises. The structure of the university was enlarged by its branches, as well as by the Academy of Corporate Education, which united the Institute of Correspondence Education and the Institute of Additional Vocational Education. A new training and laboratory complex with 12 scientific and educational centers was opened, a sports complex was built, and a residential building for teachers was constructed.

Rankings 
According to the Pension Fund's monitoring results, USURT is one of the Top-5 universities in Russia producing the most employable graduates. 

USURT is the only transport university included in the Top-100 universities in Russia according to the results of the WSJ agency ranking.

USURT ranks 23rd in the annual international Eurasian University Ranking.

USURT took the 9th place among 95 universities in Russia in the all-Russian ranking “National Recognition” in the subject “Transport”. 

USURT entered the Top-10 best universities of the Ural Federal District according to the RAEX local ranking of universities of the Ural Federal District. 

It ranks 2nd in the ranking of the portal “Abiturient Urala” and 2nd in the ranking of Yekaterinburg universities “My University”.

Structure 
The University includes:

6 faculties and 21 departments:
 Electromechanical Faculty
 "Transport Power Supply" Department
 "Electrical machines" Department
 "Electric Traction" Department
 Electrotechnical Faculty
 "Railway Automation, Telemechanics & Communication" Department
 "Information technologies and information security " Department
 Building Faculty
 "Railway Construction and Railway Track" Department
 "Bridges and Transport Tunnels" Department
 "Engineer construction and Construction Operations" Department
 Operation of Transportation Processes Faculty
 "Operations Management" Department
 "Stations, hubs and cargo work" Department
 "Technospheric Safety" Department
 "Natural sciences" Department
 Mechanical Faculty
 "Railway Cars" Department
 "Design and Operation of Automobiles" Department
 "Mechatronics" Department
 Economics Faculty
 "Management in Social and Economic Systems, Philosophy & History" Department
 "Transport Economics" Department
 "World Economy & Logistics" Department
 "Human Resources Management & Sociology" Department
 "Foreign Languages & Cross-Cultural Communication" Department
 "Physical Education" Department
 College of Railway Transport
 Medical College
 Chelyabinsk Institute of Railway Transport
 Kurgan Institute of Railway Transport
 Perm Institute of Railway Transport
 Branch of USURT in Tyumen
 Branch of USURT in Nizhny Tagil
 Branch of USURT in Zlatoust
 Representative office in Kartaly
 Academy of Corporate Education, which includes Institute of Additional Vocational Education, Institute of Correspondence Education, Institute of Distance Learning, Training Centers.
Staff and students:
 Over 18 000 students
 More than 900 highly qualified teachers (doctors and candidates of science)
Study period:
 Bachelor’s degree – 4 years of study
 Specialist degree – 5 years of study
 Master’s degree – 6 years of study
 Postgraduate degree – 3-4 years of study

Directions of training
Secondary vocational education
 08.02.10 “Railway Construction, Track and Track Facilities” (full-time or extramural);
 09.02.01 “Computer Systems and Complexes” (full-time or extramural); 
 11.02.06 “Technical Operation of Transport Electronic Equipment (by type of transport)“ (full-time or extramural);
 13.02.07 “Power Supply (by sector)” (full-time or extramural);
 23.02.01 “Organization of Transportation and Management of Transport (by type)” (full-time or extramural); 
 23.02.06 “Technical Operation of Railway Rolling Stock” (full-time or extramural);
 27.02.03 “Automation and Telemechanics on Railway Transport” (full-time);
 31.02.01 “Medical care” (full-time); 
 34.02.01 “Nursing care” (full-time or extramural);
 38.02.01 “Economics and Accounting (by sector)” (full-time).
Higher education – Specialist’s degree programs
 23.05.03 “Railway Rolling Stock” (full-time or extramural);
 23.05.04 “Railway Operation” (full-time or extramural);
 23.05.05 “Train Traffic Support Systems” (full-time or extramural);
 23.05.06 “Construction of Railways, Bridges and Transport Tunnels” (full-time or extramural). 
Higher education – Bachelor’s degree programs
 08.03.01 “Construction” (full-time or extramural);
 09.03.02 “Information Systems and Technologies” (full-time or extramural);
 10.03.01 “Information Security” (full-time); 
 13.03.02 “Power Engineering and Electrical Engineering” (full-time or extramural); 
 15.03.06 “Mechatronics and Robotics” (full-time);
 20.03.01 “Technosphere Security” (full-time or extramural); 
 23.03.01 “Technology of Transport Processes” (full-time or extramural);
 23.03.03 “Operation of transport-technological machines and complexes” (full-time or extramural);
 27.03.04 “Management in technical systems” (full-time);
 38.03.01 “Economics” (full-time, extramural, part-time);
 38.03.02 “Management” (full-time, extramural, part-time)
 38.03.03 “Personnel Management” (full-time, extramural, part-time);
 39.03.01 “Sociology” (full-time); 
 43.03.02 “Tourism” (full-time).
Higher education - Master's degree programs
 08.04.01 ‘Construction’ (full-time, correspondence form);
 09.04.02 ‘Information systems and technologies’ (full-time);
 10.04.01 ‘Information security’(full-time);
 13.04.02 ‘Electric power and electrical engineering’ (full-time, correspondence form);
 15.04.06 ‘Mechatronics and robotics’ (full-time);
 20.04.01 ‘Technosphere safety’ (full-time, correspondence form);
 23.04.01 ‘Technology of transport processes’ (full-time, correspondence form);
 23.04.03 ‘Operation of transport and technological machines and complexes’ (full-time, correspondence form);
 38.04.01 ‘Economics’ (full-time, part-time);
 38.04.02 ‘Management’ (full-time, part-time);
 38.04.03 ‘Personnel management’ (full-time, part-time)
Higher education - postgraduate programs
 09.06.01 ‘Computer Science and computer engineering’ (full-time);
 10.06.01 ‘Information security’ (full-time);
 13.06.01 ‘Electrical and thermal engineering’ (full-time);
 23.06.01 ‘Equipment and technologies of land transport’ (full-time);
 27.06.01 ‘Management in technical systems’ (full-time);
 38.06.01 ‘Economics’ (full-time).

Campus

One of the advantages of the Ural State University of Railway Transport is not only its unique location, but also the internal structure of the territory and the campus, its compactness. The main academic building, student dormitories, a sports complex, a spacious modern stadium, an independent testing center, a medical center and even a driving school with a race track are located within a walking distance. Here you can walk along the paths and alleys of the campus green zone, listen to birds’ singing, feed ducks and squirrels, admire the water surface.

From the very foundation of USURT its lecturers, students and all the other staff members have been actively involved in the campus construction. Many generations have been participating in green spaces planting, their protection and care. Every year, the university plants at least two or three dozen trees of valuable species. There is a real variety of trees on the territory of the university – such as oaks, pines, firs, limes, birches, mountain ashes, apple trees, pear trees, larches, ash trees, cherry trees, willows, poplars. More than 100 trees planted in recent years have taken root well and multiplied the green zone of the territory.

The complex of measures for the improvement and landscaping of the university territory contributes to the preservation and multiplication of natural resources, maintaining ecological balance and creating comfortable conditions for staying there.

In 2021, USURT joined the Association of Green Universities of Russia.

Student life

There are about 20 creative groups in USURT: dance groups, a rock band, Club of Cheerful and Resourceful teams, a vocal studio, a fashion theater, an art studio, a literary and musical studio ‘Slovo’, own student media holding, an amateur radio station. Students from creative groups take an active part in international, All-Russian and regional competitions and get prizes in them. In 2021, the students of USUPS became the owners of the Grand Prix of the international festival of transport universities "TranspArt".

The University has established the Center for Innovation and Technology based on the principle of FabLab (international movement of manufacturing laboratories). The FabLab laboratory is the only one in the Ural region where the students study 3D modeling, perform laser engraving, weld, solder and do everything that is necessary to master the professions of a mechanic, an electrician and an electronics engineer. Here, the students of the ‘Formula Student USURT’ team design and assemble real racing cars and make unique parts for them, and then present them at international competitions in Italy.

Sports

USURT pays great attention to students’ physical improvement and healthy lifestyle. Throughout the years of the university work, along with the organization and strengthening of the material and technical base, a lot of effort and money has been invested into the development of student sports and physical culture. The Chair of Physical Education was one of the first created at the university. At all times, it has been based on highly qualified teaching staff and coaches, including PhD, masters of sports and masters of sports of international class.

The university has created all conditions for the development of both mass sports and sports of higher achievements. That's why the sports traditions are so strong at the University. For example, since 1998, the university has been firmly on the podium of the Universiade among the universities of Ekaterinburg, and since 2009 it has no equal at the All-Russian Sports Contest among the transport universities of Russia. The national teams of the university are the elite of student sports. Health promotion, versatile physical development, improvement of sports skills is one of the priorities at the university.

One can find the opportunity to study in such sport sections as:
 Badminton
 Boxing
 Football
 Mini football
 Basketball
 Volleyball
 Skiing
 Aerobics
 Armsport
 Powerlifting
 Judo
 Chess
 Table tennis
 Hockey
 Rowing
 Athletics

International activities

USURT conducts purposeful international activities, and is actively involved in international projects, primarily with the countries of the Pacific region, Southeast Asia - Mongolia, Kazakhstan, China, as well as with the CIS countries.

The University participates in the work of such international organizations as: OSJD (Organization for Cooperation of Railways), the Association of Rectors of Transport Universities of Russia and China, the Council for Education and Science at the KTS CIS, is an official member of the International Association of Transport Universities of the Asia-Pacific region, the Association of Rectors of Transport Universities of Russia and France, BRICS countries, Russia and China. Cooperation with such European countries as Germany, Poland, Spain, Serbia is also actively developing.

There is a Preparatory Department to prepare for the enrollment to higher-level programs, study of the Russian language and culture.

USURT is also implementing DAAD, ERASMUS+ programs, scientific and technical cooperation projects with China.

The number of international students at the university complex is steadily growing. Thanks to fruitful cooperation with China and Mongolia, the share of foreign students from far abroad is increasing. PhD students from the People's Republic of China are studying at USURT. The growing presence of Chinese students has stimulated the interest of Russian students in learning Chinese. A significant number of USURT students have studied abroad thanks to the activity of the BEST student organization, which successfully establishes the international relations and actively participates in various student events throughout Europe.

USURT has concluded more than 30 international agreements on cooperation and exchange with universities in Europe and Asia. The teachers of the Chair of Foreign Languages and International Communications are actively working to promote international mobility among USURT students.

References

External links
 Official website
 USURT community in the social network VKontakte
 The official USURT channel on YouTube
 The official USURT community in TikTok
 The official USURT page in Instagram

Universities and institutes established in the Soviet Union
Buildings and structures in Yekaterinburg
Universities in Sverdlovsk Oblast